In statistics, Fieller's theorem allows the calculation of a confidence interval for the ratio of two means.

Approximate confidence interval
Variables a and b may be measured in different units, so there is no way to directly combine the standard errors as they may also be in different units. The most complete discussion of this is given by Fieller (1954).

 

where

Three features of this formula are important in this context:

a) The expression inside the square root has to be positive, or else the resulting interval will be imaginary.

b) When g is very close to 1, the confidence interval is infinite.

c) When g is greater than 1, the overall divisor outside the square brackets is negative and the confidence interval is exclusive.

Other methods 

One problem is that, when g is not small, the confidence interval can blow up when using Fieller's theorem. Andy Grieve has provided a Bayesian solution where the CIs are still sensible, albeit wide. Bootstrapping provides another alternative that does not require the assumption of normality.

History 
Edgar C. Fieller (1907–1960) first started working on this problem while in Karl Pearson's group at University College London, where he was employed for five years after graduating in Mathematics from King's College, Cambridge. He then worked for the Boots Pure Drug Company as a statistician and operational researcher before becoming deputy head of operational research at RAF Fighter Command during the Second World War, after which he was appointed the first head of the Statistics Section at the National Physical Laboratory.

See also
Gaussian ratio distribution

Notes

Further reading 
 
 
 Fieller, EC. (1940) "The biological standardisation of insulin". Journal of the Royal Statistical Society (Supplement). 1:1–54. 
 
 Motulsky, Harvey (1995) Intuitive Biostatistics. Oxford University Press. 
 Senn, Steven (2007) Statistical Issues in Drug Development. Second Edition. Wiley. 

Theorems in statistics
Statistical approximations
Normal distribution